Futsal for the 2013 Asian Indoor and Martial Arts Games was held in two venues, at the Songdo Global Campus, and the Dongbu Students Gymnasium. Matches took place from 26 June to 6 July 2013, with a break on 2 July.

Medalists

Medal table

Results

Men

Group stage

Group A

Group B

Group C

Group D

Group E

Group F

Group G

Second-placed teams

Knockout stage

Quarterfinals

Semifinals

Bronze medal match

Gold medal match

Goalscorers

Women

Group stage

Group A

Group B

Knockout stage

Semifinals

Bronze medal match

Gold medal match

Goalscorers

References

External links 
 
 Futsal Planet

Asian Indoor Games
2013
2013 Asian Indoor and Martial Arts Games events
International futsal competitions hosted by South Korea